Earl Bruce Heilman (July 16, 1926 – October 19, 2019) was an American educator who served as president of the University of Richmond and Meredith College.  He last held the positions of chancellor at the University of Richmond and National Spokesman of The Greatest Generations Foundation.

Education
Heilman was born in 1926 in Smithfield, Kentucky. He received his Bachelor of Arts, Master of Arts, and Ph.D. from Peabody College, now a part of Vanderbilt University. Heilman served in the United States Marine Corps during World War II. He also attended Campbellsville Junior College, the University of Omaha, the University of Kentucky, and the University of Tennessee.

Academic appointments
In his early career, Heilman held teaching positions at Belmont University, Kentucky Wesleyan College, and Peabody College. He also held administrative positions at Kentucky Wesleyan College, Georgetown College, Peabody College, and Kentucky Southern College (now a part of the University of Louisville).  He served as president of Meredith College from 1966 to 1971.  In 1971, he assumed the presidency of the University of Richmond, and remained in that position until 1986.  He returned to the position on an interim basis in 1987–1988 after the unexpected resignation of his successor, Samuel A. Banks.

His tenure at the University of Richmond was notable for abetting the largest donation to a university.  E. Claiborne Robins Sr, an alumnus and trustee, donated $50 million to the university, at the time the largest gift from a private individual to a US school. Robins' gift consisted of $40 million in the form of common stock in the A.H. Robins company and an additional $10 million earmarked as a challenge gift for matching funds to be raised by the university over the next ten-year period. In partnership with his vice president of development H. Gerald Quigg, Heilman directed the successful matching effort, ultimately leading to a $60 million addition to the university's endowment.

Death
Heilman died on October 19, 2019, at age 93.

References

External links
 History of the University of Richmond: People: Dr. E. Bruce Heilman 

1926 births
2019 deaths
United States Marine Corps personnel of World War II
Educators from Kentucky
Meredith College people
Military personnel from Kentucky
Peabody College alumni
People from Henry County, Kentucky
Presidents of the University of Richmond
United States Marines
University of Richmond faculty